Islamic Organisation "Young Afghanistan" is a political party in Afghanistan, led by Seyyed Jawad Hossaini. The party has formed part of the Advisory Commission of National and Democratic Parties and the National Understanding Front of Afghanistan.

References

Islamic political parties in Afghanistan
Political parties in Afghanistan